Paliy uprising (also Palej uprising) was a Cossack uprising, led by colonel Semen Paliy against the Polish–Lithuanian Commonwealth in 1702-1704.

In 1699 a new Polish king Augustus II disbanded the Cossack militia and signed a peace treaty with Ottoman Turkey. Cossacks were angered by this situation, and in 1702 colonel (polkovnyk) Paliy started an open rebellion against the crown, the last of the major Cossack uprisings against the Commonwealth. Together with a number of other Cossack polkovnyks, Paliy and his rebels captured Bila Tserkva, Fastiv, Nemirov and a few other towns. Rebellious Cossacks massacred their traditional enemies - Polish szlachta, Catholic priests and Jews - in the area they controlled. On October 17, 1702 Paliy and his Cossacks were defeated by the Polish army under hetman Adam Mikołaj Sieniawski near the town of Berdychiv and later at Nemirov and at Webricze in February 1703. Paliy's last stand was at Bila Tserkva.

Russian Tsar Peter I and left-bank Ukraine ataman Ivan Mazepa, who were allied with Poland against Sweden at the time, intervened diplomatically, arranging a ceasefire, and ordered Paliy to surrender Bila Tserkva, but he and his men refused. Mazepa convinced Russian Tsar Peter I to allow him to intervene, which he successfully did, taking over major portions of right-bank Ukraine. Fearing the popularity of Paliy, Mazepa had him exiled to Siberia in 1705.

References 

Cossack uprisings
1700s in Ukraine
Conflicts in 1702
Conflicts in 1703
Conflicts in 1704
1702 in the Polish–Lithuanian Commonwealth
1703 in the Polish–Lithuanian Commonwealth
1704 in the Polish–Lithuanian Commonwealth
18th century in the Zaporozhian Host
18th-century rebellions